The final 10th Vijay Awards ceremony honouring the best of the Tamil film industry in 2017 was held on 26 May 2018 at Chennai. The event was hosted by Gopinath and Divyadharshini.

Jury 
K. Bhagyaraj, Radha, Yugi Sethu, Anurag Kashyap and K. S. Ravikumar are the jurors of 10th Edition Vijay Awards.

Winners and nominees 
Source:

Jury awards 

Special Jury Awards

Favorite awards

References 

Vijay Awards
2017 Indian film awards